Grand Ayatollah Sheikh Muhammad-Taqi Golshan Shirazi Ha'eri, also known as al-Mirza al-Thani (the first being Mirza Shirazi), was a senior Iranian-Iraqi jurist and political leader. He led the Iraqi revolt of 1920.

Early life and education 
Shirazi was born in 1840, to Mirza Muhib Ali Golshan Shirazi. His uncle was Mirza Habibullah Shirazi, a famous Iranian poet.

He migrated to Karbala in 1854, and began his religious studies there, under scholars such as Sheikh Zayn al-Abideen al-Mazandarani, Sayyid Ali Taqi al-Tabatabaei, and Sheikh Fadhil al-Ardakani. He was granted ijazas by Mirza Husayn al-Khalili, Sheikh Husayn bin Taqi al-Nuri, Sheikh Abbas al-Tehrani, and Mirza Hasan Khan al-Shirazi. He then moved to Samarra along with his mentor and predecessor, Mirza Shirazi, to establish the city, as the new Shi'ite intellectual loci. In Samarra, Shirazi spent his time teaching and delivering lectures at the seminary. After the demise of his teacher, Shirazi took the reins of the seminary in Samarra.

He remained in Samarra until 1916, where the situation began to deteriorate, and Shirazi feared that Samarra was going to end up like Kut, during its siege, so he travelled to Kadhimiya. He remained there for just under two years, until he finally settled in Karbala.

Work 
Shirazi had a number of publications, and often used Gulshan as his pen name:

 . A commentary on Murtadha al-Ansari's .
 . An exposition on Sadr al-Din al-Amili's .
 Divan in the Persian language.
 
 
 . Poetry in praise of the Ahl al-Bayt.

Death 
Shirazi died on August 28, 1920 in Karbala at the age of eighty. Sheikh Fatthullah al-Isfahani offered the prayers in his funeral, and then he was buried in the southern chamber in the Imam Husayn shrine courtyard.

References 

Iraqi grand ayatollahs
People from Karbala
People from Shiraz
1840 births
1920 deaths
People from the Ottoman Empire of Iranian descent
Iraqi people of Iranian descent
19th-century Iranian writers
Iraqi revolt of 1920